Isiala Oboro (formerly known as Mbiopong) is a village in the Oboro community of Ikwuano Local Government Area of Abia State, Nigeria. It is the headquarters of Ikwuano LGA. Isiama Oboro is the autonomous community of Isiala. The traditional head of Isiama Oboro is HRH Prof. Eze Sunday Ezeribe. He is conferred with the title of Isioha II of Isiama.

See also 
• Elemaga

References 

Populated places in Abia State

External links 
 https://allnews.ng/local-govt-area/ikwuano
 https://www.sunnewsonline.com/ikwuano-summit-2023-cbo-explores-agrarian-rural-community-development/
 https://www.researchgate.net/publication/356191302_ORIGIN_MIGRATION_AND_SETTLEMENT_IN_PRE-COLONIAL_OLD_BENDE_DIVISION_OF_SOUTHEASTERN_NIGERA

Populated places in Abia State